is a city located on the east coast of Ōita Prefecture, Japan.  It is famous for its Usuki Stone Buddhas, a national treasure, and its soy sauce production.  Recently it has become known for having the look and feel of a Japanese castle town.  It is part of Ōita City's metropolitan area through economics and thus has strong ties to Ōita City.

Demographics and geography 
As of March 1, 2017, the city has an estimated population of 38,090 and a population density of 140 persons per km2. The total area is 291.08 km2.
 
The city is bordered by Ōita City, Saiki, Tsukumi, and Bungo-ōno. The city looks upon the Bungo Channel in the east. The city surrounds the Bay of Usuki with the Saganoseki Peninsula in the north and the Nagame Peninsula in the south. Within the bay are Kuroshima Island and Tsukumi Island. Water from the bay flows into Usuki River, around whose flat lands town areas have been built. The northern part of the city has gently-sloping hills while the southern part has mountain ranges that are 500m to 600m above sea level.

History 
The city was founded on April 1, 1950. On March 31, 1954, multiple towns were merged into Usuki.

On January 1, 2005, the town of Notsu (from Ōno District) was merged into Usuki.

William Adams, Jan Joosten, Jacob Quaeckernaeck and Melchior van Santvoort got stranded on the coast of Bungo, now Usuki City, in April 1600, on the ship "De Liefde", marking the first contact that led to many years of Dutch-Japanese trading partnership.

Economy 

Agriculture and fishing are the primary industries, however the production of soy sauce and miso paste are also popular. Many people come from abroad to work at Usuki shipyards.  The city is well known for its kabosu fruits.

Historical and Sightseeing Sites 

Usuki Stone Buddhas, a national treasure and special historical landmark
Usuki Castle
Nioza Historical Road
Inaba-Family Villa, a former samurai residence
Hakubakei
Furen Limestone Caves, a national monument
Meiji Era Bridge
Nogami Yaeko Memorial Museum
Fugen Temple, burial site of Kicchomu
Usuki City Historical Museum, open on April 26, 2014
Naora Nobuo Memorial Museum

Festivals 

Major festivals in Usuki include the Gion Festival (mid July), Stone Buddhas Fire Festival (late August), and Bamboo Lantern Festival (early November). There are also festivities and celebrations during the cherry blossom blooming period in April, for example at Usuki Castle.

Transportation 

The city is on the Nippō Main Railway Line and it can be reached by local and limited express trains.

The city is accessible by car from the Higashi Kyushu Expressway with an exit at Usuki Interchange.  The national highways number 10, 217, and 502 and the Oita Prefecture roads number 21, 25, 33, and 53 also run through the city.

The Ōita Bus Company offers inter-city buses to Usuki as well as buses within the city.

Ferries travel between Usuki and Yawatahama City in Ehime Prefecture, Shikoku through the two ferry companies Kyūshi Orange Ferry and Uwajima Unyu Ferry.

Education 

Excluding closed schools, Usuki City has 15 elementary schools and 6 junior high schools, all of which are city-run. There is also a prefectural school specifically for handicapped children.

Prefectural High Schools
Usuki High School
Usuki Shougyou High School (for Commerce) (closed down)
Usuki Kaiyou Kagaku High School (for Marine Science)
Notsu High School (closed down)

Famous People from Usuki 
Tatsuo Yamamoto, politician
Tadatomo Yoshida, politician
Yaeko Nogami, novelist
Jun Hirose, baseball player
Hiromi Wada, baseball player and commentator
Masako Miura, voice actress
Maiko Itai, model and Miss Universe 2010
Keiko Komuro, singer

Movies set in Usuki 

なごり雪 (The Last Snow) (2002)
22才の別れ Lycoris 葉見ず花見ず物語 (Exchange Students - Goodbye to You) (2007)

Sister Cities 

  Kandy, Sri Lanka (February 27, 1967): sister city
  Dunhuang, China (September 27, 1994): friendship city

References

Sources 
This article incorporates information translated from the article 臼杵市 (Usuki-shi) in the Japanese Wikipedia, retrieved before September 28, 2011.

External links 

 Usuki City official website 
  Usuki City Tourism Promotion Film 2014

Cities in Ōita Prefecture